Sponsler is an unincorporated community in Greene County, Indiana, in the United States.

History
Sponsler was named in honor of William Sponsler, the original owner of the town site.

References

Unincorporated communities in Greene County, Indiana
Unincorporated communities in Indiana